This is a list of sovereign states without a stock exchange:

The following de facto states do not maintain stock exchanges:

A number of Caribbean countries are served by the Eastern Caribbean Securities Exchange (ECSE), based in Basseterre, Saint Kitts and Nevis. Thus, there is no individual stock exchange on their territories.

 (BOT)

 (BOT)

See also
List of stock exchanges

References

Stock exchange, without
Countries Without